Carlton Kids was a British digital terrestrial pay television kids channel, provided by Carlton Television, which started broadcasting on 15th November 1998 and closed on 31st January 2000. Its sister channels were Carlton Food Network, Carlton World, Carlton Cinema and Carlton Select. It broadcast exclusively on ONdigital, the digital terrestrial pay-TV platform backed by Carlton and Granada, where it timeshared on channel 34 with Carlton World.

The channel had limited coverage, reaching only 69% of the population via the lowest-powered terrestrial multiplex D, and newspapers and listings magazines were slow to feature the channel's programming. In the face of competition from several other dedicated children's channels in the UK market the channel ceased broadcasting at the end of January 2000 after 2 years, partly due to the limited uptake of the ONdigital platform where it was exclusively available. It was replaced by Discovery Kids. The other Carlton channels closed over the next few years.

Carlton Television later merged with Granada in 2004 to form ITV plc, which went on to launch another children's channel CITV, in 2006.

Programming
The channel showcased children's programming from Carlton and other ITV franchisees including Granada Television, Central Television, and Yorkshire Television, short films from the BBC library, as well as programmes acquired from American and overseas distributors. Shows included Mopatop's Shop, The Raggy Dolls, Rosie & Jim, Tots TV, The Berenstain Bears, Tickle on the Tum, Willo the Wisp, The Legends of Treasure Island and Worzel Gummidge.

Presentation was provided by daily wrap-around shows "Wakey Wakey" and "The Max". Both were recorded at Ealing Studios. "Wakey Wakey" was presented by Chuck Thomas and Naomi Wilkinson. The Max was presented by Angellica Bell and Paul Leyshon. Other presenters included Jamie Rickers and Alex Verrey.

List of programs

Wrap-Around
 The Max
 Tiny Time
 Wakey Wakey
 RAW TV

Drama
 Byker Grove
 Harry's Mad
 Woof!

Fantasy
  The Worst Witch

Animated
 The Adventures of Sir Prancelot
 Around the World in Eighty Days (1972 series)
 The Berenstain Bears (1985 series)
 Bod
 Bolek and Lolek (as Jym and Jam)
 Car-Toon Time with Little Brrrrm
 Denver, the Last Dinosaur
 The Dreamstone
  Goodtimes Family Classics
 Henry's Cat
 Ketchup: Cats Who Cook
 The Legends of Treasure Island
 Molly's Gang
 Noah and Nelly in... SkylArk
 Puppydog Tales
 The Raggy Dolls
 Rubbish, King of the Jumble
 Willo the Wisp

Education
 Alphabet Castle
 Tickle on the Tum

Food
 Food Factory
 Planet Nosh
 School Dinners

Comedy
 The Big Comfy Couch
 Worzel Gummidge

Puppet
 Mopatop's Shop
 Rosie & Jim
 Tots TV

Sports
 High Five

References

External links
Carlton Kids at TVARK

Carlton Television
Defunct television channels in the United Kingdom
Television channels and stations established in 1998
Television channels and stations disestablished in 2000
Children's television channels in the United Kingdom